The Retimohniidae are  taxonomic family in the superfamily Buccinoidea of large sea snails, often known as whelks and the like.

Genera
 Fusipagoda Habe & Ki. Ito, 1965
 Retifusus Dall, 1916
 Retimohnia J. H. McLean, 1995

References

External links
 Kantor, Y.I., Fedosov, A.E., Kosyan, A.R., Puillandre, N., Sorokin, P.A., Kano, Y., Clark, R. N. & Bouchet, P. (2022 (nomenclatural availability: 2021) . Molecular phylogeny and revised classification of the Buccinoidea (Neogastropoda). Zoological Journal of the Linnean Society. 194: 789-857.

Buccinoidea